Foreign relations of Congo may refer to:
Foreign relations of the Democratic Republic of the Congo
Foreign relations of the Republic of the Congo